Sceloporus hunsakeri, Hunsaker's spiny lizard, is a species of lizard in the family Phrynosomatidae. It is endemic to Mexico.

References

Sceloporus
Endemic reptiles of Mexico
Reptiles described in 1979
Taxa named by Hobart Muir Smith